The Salman is a solid-propellant rocket motor designed and built by the Islamic Revolutionary Guard Corps. It is used as the second stage of the Qased and Qaem-100 satellite launch vehicles. The system was announced on 9 February 2020 and was launched for the first time on 22 April 2020, placing Iran's first military satellite, named Noor, into orbit.

Design 
Salman weighs 1900 kilograms, has a diameter of 1 meter, and fires for 60 seconds. In contrast to previous Iranian commercial and military rocket designs, Salman has a wound carbon-fiber composite casing rather than the traditional steel motor casings typical of other Iranian designs, this drastically reduces weight and improves performance, allowing for more payload capacity. 

Another break with past Iranian designs is the first ever use of gimballed thrust vector control (TVC) for steering as opposed to aerodynamic control surfaces, jet vanes, or vernier thrusters previously used. A steerable nozzle provides several advantages to Salman as opposed to other methods that result in its superior performance and efficiency; as opposed to jet vanes, no thrust is lost in a gimballed system when steering; control surfaces only work in endo-atmospheric flight and cannot be used for injecting satellites or atmospheric re-entry; vernier thrusters and their associated piping, turbopumps, tanks etc... are heavy and their omission could make way for a larger payload.

Launch history

See also 

 Qased (rocket)
 Qaem-100 (rocket)
 IRGC Aerospace Force
 Noor (satellite)
 List of upper-stages
 Iranian Space Agency

References 

Rocket stages